Amir Alin Aq Palace (also known as Amir Khayrbak Palace, Emir Khayrbak Palace, or Amir Khayr Bek Palace) was built in 1293. It stands on the Darb al-Ahmar, the ceremonial road leading to the Citadel in Cairo, Egypt. Its reception hall (qa'a) is particularly notable.

Alin Aq was an amir and cupbearer to Sultan al-Ashraf Khalil ibn Qalawun. This building is early Bahri and is now in ruins, with the exception of the portal. In the 16th century it was the residence of the Amir Khayrbak, whose mosque is adjacent.

Khayrbak was the first Ottoman governor of Egypt. It is said he was cruel and greedy.

See also
 Amir Khayrbak Funerary Complex

References

Buildings and structures completed in 1293
Palaces in Cairo
Mamluk architecture